The Freedom 39, also called the Freedom 39 Express, is an American sailboat that was designed by Ron Holland and Gary Hoyt as a cruiser and first built in 1983.

The Freedom 39 was introduced at the same time as the related Freedom 39 PH design, a boat with a similar hull, but a schooner rig and a pilothouse.

Production
The boat was built by Tillotson Pearson in the United States for Freedom Yachts, starting in 1983.

Design
The Freedom 39 is a recreational keelboat, built predominantly of fiberglass, with wooden trim. It is a cat-rigged ketch, with carbon-fiber conventional booms and two free-standing carbon-fiber masts. It has an aft cockpit and features a raked stem, a slightly reverse transom, a skeg-mounted rudder controlled by a wheel and a fixed fin keel. The design displaces  and carries  of lead ballast.

The boat is fitted with a British Perkins Engines 4-108  for docking and maneuvering.

The design has sleeping accommodations for six people. It has a private, aft, double cabin, under the cockpit on the starboard side, two pilot berths in the main cabin and a double berth in the bow cabin. The galley is "U"-shaped and located on the port side, at the foot of the companionway steps. It includes a three-burner stove and double sinks. The head is located just aft of the bow cabin on the starboard side.

See also
List of sailing boat types

Related development
Freedom 39 PH

Similar sailboats
Baltic 40
Cal 39
Cal 39 Mark II
Cal 39 (Hunt/O'Day)
Corbin 39
Islander 40
Nautical 39
Nordic 40

References

Keelboats
1980s sailboat type designs
Sailing yachts
Sailboat type designs by Gary Hoyt
Sailboat type designs by Ron Holland
Sailboat types built by Pearson Yachts